Tickle fight is a playful leisure activity in which two people, or sometimes more, tickle each other to the point where one of the participants gives up. It can occur as a sudden outburst without consensus about it, or as a carefully designed challenge with clear ground rules. Tickle fighting is similar to pillow fighting, in the sense that they are both silly and playful activities, usually not taken too seriously. Tickle fight should not be confused with tickle torture, which is an abusive and serious torturing method.

A participant in a tickle fight can be called a tickler.

Politics
There has been accusations of Barack Obama breaking his friend's arm in a tickle fight while he was living in the Indonesia. It quite likely happened when Mr. Obama was under 10 years old.

Law enforcement
There was a case in Rexburg, Idaho where concerned resident contacted local police department, after hearing someone yelling out loud "Stop!". However, when the police arrived to the scene, they were told by the tenants of the apartment that it was only a tickle fight.

Sports
There has been a recorded case where playful tickle fight occurred at a sports event.

"Anthrozooism"
Robin Williams once had a playful tickle fight with a gorilla named Koko. The gorilla also took Mr. Williams's spectacles and stole a wallet.

Pop culture
In the TV series The Big Bang Theory, its 229th episode The Cognition Regeneration has a scene where one of the main characters, Dr. Sheldon Cooper, declines to have a tickle fight with his girlfriend Dr. Amy Farrah Fowler, after she suggests that Dr. Cooper should challenge his motor skills.

See also
 Erotic tickling, from erotic perspective
 Food fight
 Snowball fight
 Water pistol fight
 Pillow fight

References

External links
 wikiHow: How to win a tickle fight

Fight play
Mock combat